Party Party or The Party Party may refer to 

 Party of the Future, a Dutch political party sometimes known as The Party Party
 Party Party (film), (1983) a teen/youth comedy about the antics of young people in South London on New Year's Eve
 "Party Party", Elvis Costello and the Attractions single from the soundtrack of the film
 Party Party (soundtrack), soundtrack to the film
 The Party Party (radio series), a British radio series 1987 
 Party/Party, an American reality television series aired on Bravo